Nathan W. Ackerman (November 22, 1908, Bessarabia, Russian Empire – June 12, 1971, New York) was an American psychiatrist, psychoanalyst, and one of the most important pioneers of the field of family therapy. He also was an expert in marriage counselling.

Biography
Ackerman was born to David Ackerman and Bertha Greenberg, both pharmacists.

Ackerman obtained his medical degree from Columbia University in 1933. He assumed the post of chief psychiatrist at the Menninger Child Guidance Clinic (see Menninger Foundation) in 1937. In 1955, he contributed to the founding of the American Academy of Psychoanalysis.   In 1957 he founded the Family Mental Health Clinic in New York, and the Family Institute in 1960, which was later renamed the Ackerman Institute after his death in New York in 1971. In 1961 he co-founded the first ever family therapy journal Family Process with Donald deAvila Jackson and Jay Haley.

Ackerman attended a public school in New York City. In 1929 he was awarded a B.A. from Columbia University, and in 1933 earned his M.D. from the same university. After a short spell (1933–34) as an intern at the Montefiore Hospital in New York, he interned at the Menninger Clinic and Sanitorium in Topeka, Kansas. He joined their psychiatric staff in 1935.

Works
Ackerman greatly influenced and concentrated on the study on psychosexual stages on character formation and was one of the first clinicians to attempt to integrate insights from individual psychotherapy with the then newer ideas from systems theory. He is best known for his contribution to the development of the psychodynamic approach to family therapy. With regards to family therapy, Ackerman incorporated the idea of "the family being a social and emotional unit." His main focuses, with respect to family therapy, were intergenerational ties and conflicts, the influence of long-term social change impacting the family, the developmental stages of the family as a single unit, the importance of emotion within the family structure, and equal amounts of authority among parents.

Bibliography

Ackerman, N.W. (1958).  The Psychodynamics of Family Life. Basic Books: New York.
Ackerman, N.W., Beatman, F.L. & Sherman, S.N. (Eds.) (1961). Exploring the base for family therapy: papers from the M. Robert Gomberg Memorial Conference (held on June 2 and 3 1960, at the Academy of Medicine, New York, N.Y.) Family Service Association of America: New York.
Ackerman, N.W. (1962). Family Psychotherapy and Psychoanalysis: The Implications of Difference. Family Process. 1 (1) pp. 30–43, March 1962.
Ackerman, N.W. (1966).  Treating the Troubled Family. Basic Books: New York.
Ackerman, N.W. (1970). Family process. Basic Books: New York.
Ackerman, N.W., co-written with Javad Nurbakhsh and Hamideh Jahangiri (2019).

Death
Nathan Ackerman died of a heart attack in 1971 in Putnam Valley, New York

See also
Ackerman Institute for the Family
Family therapy
Interpersonal therapy
Psychoanalysis
Harry Stack Sullivan

References

External links
Profile from Allyn and Bacon/Longman publishing.
Profile from Encyclopedia of Psychology.
Ackerman Institute for the Family

1908 births
1971 deaths
People from Bessarabia Governorate
Bessarabian Jews
Emigrants from the Russian Empire to the United States
American psychiatrists
American psychotherapists
Family therapists
Jewish psychiatrists
20th-century American physicians
Columbia University Vagelos College of Physicians and Surgeons alumni